The Sigma Phi Society was founded in 1827 at Union College. It was the second Greek fraternal organization founded in the United States and the first to establish a chapter at another college, making it the first national Greek organization. Sigma Phi is a member of the North American Interfraternity Conference.

History
The Sigma Phi Society was founded on March 4, 1827, on the campus of Union College as a part of the Union Triad in Schenectady, New York. Its founders were Samuel W. Beall, Thomas Fielder Bowie, Rev. R. H. Chapman, Hon. Charles T. Cromwell, George N, Porter, and Hon. Charles N. Rowley.

The Alpha chapter of Sigma Phi at Union College has been in continuous operation since its founding, making it the oldest continuously running fraternity chapter in the United States. 

In 1831, Beta of New York was established at Hamilton College, making the society the first Greek fraternal organization in the United States to establish a chapter at another college. Thus, Sigma Phi Society is the first National Greek Organization in the United States. 

The practices and rituals of the Sigma Phi Society are relatively unknown due to its establishment, and continued consideration, as a secret society.

Sigma Phi is a member of the North American Interfraternity Conference.

Symbols 
The Sigma Phi badge is a monogram with a jeweled Σ directly over a Φ that is either plain or chased. It was designed by Charles N. Rowley, founder of the Beta of New York chapter. In 1879, Baird's stated that the badge was royal purple.

Chapters
Chapters of Sigma Phi, with active chapters indicated in bold and inactive chapters indicated in italic:

Notes

Chapter houses 
Some chapters own buildings on the National Register of Historic Places, such as the Thorsen House, owned by the Alpha of California chapter in Berkeley and designed by Greene and Greene. The Alpha of Wisconsin chapter house is the Harold C. Bradley House, a National Historic Landmark designed in 1908 by Louis Sullivan.

Alpha of Vermont 

The Alpha of Vermont chapter house, known as Sigma Phi Place, is a list contributing building to the National Registry of Historic Places' University Green Historic District. It was designed in 1903 by architect Marcus T. Reynolds of Albany, New York, who was a member of the Alpha of Massachusetts chapter. Located at 420 College Street, Sigma Pi Place was the first purpose-built fraternity house at the University of Vermont. It is a three-story, Colonial Revival style brick house. Its main entrance has a gable pedimented portico with four columns that have Corinthian capitals.

Notable alumni

See also
Triad (fraternities)
List of social fraternities and sororities

References

 
Student organizations established in 1827
Union College (New York)
Student societies in the United States
North American Interfraternity Conference
Collegiate secret societies
1827 establishments in New York (state)